Alfred Ernest Tysoe (21 March 1874 – 26 October 1901) was an English athlete, and winner of two gold medals at the 1900 Olympic Games representing Great Britain.

Biography
Born in the Old Vicarage, Padiham, near Burnley England, Tysoe ran part-time with the Skerton Harriers running team while still working as a farm labourer.

In 1896, he won the Northern Counties 1000y and one mile titles. His running successes brought him to the attention of Harold Hardwick, founder of Salford Harriers in 1884; in 1897 Tysoe was persuaded to join the Salford club. Within his first year with Salford Harriers, he had won the AAA championships at one and ten miles. In 1898, he helped the team to win their sixth National Cross Country championship.

At the 1900 Olympic Games in Paris, Tysoe was a favourite in the 800m, having just one week before the games won the AAA championship in 1:57.8. He won easily, beating John Cregan from the United States by 3 yards. He also won a gold medal as part of the British team in the 5000m team race.

This proved to be his last season on the running track. In 1901, he became severely ill with pleurisy and died at his home in Blackpool, aged 27.

He is buried in Layton Cemetery, Blackpool. His gravestone reads: "In loving memory of Alfred Ernest Tysoe. Amateur Champion half-mile runner of the world.

Born March 21st 1874, Died October 26th 1901. 'Brief life is here our portion, brief sorrow, short-lived care. The life that knows no ending, the tearless life is there.' This stone was erected by the many admirers of this famous athlete, by whom he was held in the highest esteem."

References

External links

1874 births
1901 deaths
English male middle-distance runners
English Olympic medallists
People from Padiham
Olympic athletes of Great Britain
Olympic gold medallists for Great Britain
Athletes (track and field) at the 1900 Summer Olympics
Medalists at the 1900 Summer Olympics
Olympic gold medalists in athletics (track and field)